Garrett Antony-Charles Mitchell (born September 4, 1998) is an American professional baseball outfielder for the Milwaukee Brewers of Major League Baseball (MLB). Mitchell was selected 20th overall by the Brewers in the 2020 MLB draft.

Early life and high school
Mitchell grew up in Orange, California, and attended the Lutheran High School of Orange County, where he was a four-year member of the varsity baseball team. He was diagnosed with Type 1 Diabetes at nine years old.

Regarded as a top collegiate prospect, Mitchell committed to the University of California, Los Angeles (UCLA) to play college baseball for the UCLA Bruins during his sophomore year at Lutheran. He batted .299 with 19 runs scored and 11 runs batted in (RBIs) despite a slow start as a junior. He played in the 2016 Perfect Game All-America Baseball Game and the Under Armour All-America Baseball Game.

The Oakland Athletics selected Mitchell in the 14th round (411 overall) of the 2017 Major League Baseball draft, but he opted not to sign with the team and attend UCLA. Mitchell played summer collegiate baseball after graduating high school for the Walla Walla Sweets of the West Coast League, batting .462 with one home run and four RBIs in 13 at-bats.

College career
As a true freshman, Mitchell was named the Bruins starting right fielder and the Preseason Freshman of the Year by Baseball America. Over 44 games, he batted .280 with 44 hits and 31 RBIs, missing time during the season due to health issues. Mitchell played summer baseball in the Northwoods League for the Mankato MoonDogs. During his sophomore year in 2019, he batted .349 with 14 doubles, 12 triples (a UCLA single season record), six home runs, 57 runs scored, and 41 RBIs and was named first team All-Pac-12 Conference and a third team All-American by the NCBWA and ABCA. Mitchell spent the following summer playing for the United States collegiate national baseball team.

Mitchell entered his junior season on the watch list for the Golden Spikes Award and as a top prospect for the 2020 Major League Baseball draft. Mitchell batted .355 with nine RBIs and 18 runs with five stolen bases before the season was cut short due to the coronavirus pandemic.

Professional career
The Milwaukee Brewers selected Mitchell in the first round, with the twentieth overall pick, in the 2020 Major League Baseball draft. He signed with the Brewers on July 7 and received a $3.2 million bonus. Mitchell was named to Milwaukee's 2021 Spring Training roster as a non-roster invitee and batted .367 with one home run and six RBIs in 22 games.

Mitchell was assigned to the High-A Wisconsin Timber Rattlers to start the 2021 season. He was promoted to the Double-A Biloxi Shuckers in early July after slashing .359/.504/.620 with five home runs, 33 runs scored, 20 RBIs, and 12 stolen bases over 28 games with the Timber Rattlers. Over 35 games with Biloxi to end the season, he batted .186/.291/.264 with three home runs and ten RBIs over 35 games. He missed time during the season due to a leg injury.

Mitchell returned to Biloxi to start the 2022 season. He suffered an oblique injury in May and was placed on the injured list until July 7, 2022, after a rehab assignment with the Arizona Complex League Brewers. Mitchell batted .277 with four home runs and 25 RBIs in 44 games with the Shuckers before being promoted to the Triple-A Nashville Sounds.

On August 27, 2022, the Brewers selected his contract from Nashville, promoting him to the major leagues. He missed the phone call from Sounds manager Rick Sweet informing him of his promotion to the majors, telling reporters it was because he was eating a chocolate chip cookie. He made his debut later that day, playing center field at the end of the game. He had his first major league start the day after, on August 28, playing center field and batting 9th. His first at-bat resulted in a flyout to left field.
His second at-bat was his first major league hit, a two RBI double into centerfield that gave Milwaukee the lead. He hit his first home run against the Pittsburgh Pirates in the bottom of the eighth inning on August 29, 2022.

Personal life
In 2021, Mitchell married professional softball player Haley Cruse.

References

External links

UCLA Bruins bio

Living people
1998 births
Sportspeople from Orange, California
Baseball players from California
Major League Baseball outfielders
Milwaukee Brewers players
UCLA Bruins baseball players
United States national baseball team players
Mankato MoonDogs players
Walla Walla Sweets players
Wisconsin Timber Rattlers players
Biloxi Shuckers players
Nashville Sounds players
Arizona Complex League Brewers players